A matriarchal religion is a religion that focuses on a goddess or goddesses. The term is most often used to refer to theories of prehistoric matriarchal religions that were proposed by scholars such as Johann Jakob Bachofen, Jane Ellen Harrison, and Marija Gimbutas, and later popularized by second-wave feminism.  In the 20th century, a movement to revive these practices resulted in the Goddess movement.

History

The concept of a prehistoric matriarchy was introduced in 1861 when Johann Jakob Bachofen published Mother Right: An Investigation of the Religious and Juridical Character of Matriarchy in the Ancient World.  He postulated that the historical patriarchates were a comparatively recent development, having replaced an earlier state of primeval matriarchy, and postulated a "chthonic-maternal" prehistoric religion. Bachofen presents a model where matriarchal society and chthonic mystery cults are the second of four stages of the historical development of religion.
The first stage he called "Hetaerism", characterized as a paleolithic hunter-and-gatherer society practicing a polyamorous and communistic lifestyle. The second stage is the Neolithic, a matriarchal lunar stage of  agriculture with an early form of Demeter the dominant deity. This was followed by a "Dionysian" stage of emerging patriarchy, finally succeeded by the "Apollonian" stage of patriarchy and the appearance of civilization in classical antiquity. The idea that this time period was a golden age that was displaced with the advent of patriarchy was first described by Friedrich Engels in his The Origin of the Family, Private Property, and the State.

The British archaeologist Sir Arthur Evans, the main rediscoverer and promoter of Minoan civilization, believed that Minoan religion more or less exclusively worshiped a mother goddess, and his view held sway for the first part of the 20th century, with a wide-ranging influence on thinking in various fields.  Modern scholars agree that a mother or nature goddess was probably a dominant deity, but that there were also male deities.

In the early 1900s, historian Jane Ellen Harrison put forward the theory that the Olympian pantheon replaced an earlier worship of earth goddesses.

Robert Graves postulated a prehistoric matriarchal religion in the 1950s, in his The Greek Myths and The White Goddess, and gave a detailed depiction of a future society with a matriarchal religion in his novel Seven Days in New Crete.

Inspired by Graves and other sources was the Austrian Surrealist Wolfgang Paalen who, in his painting "Pays interdit" ("Forbidden Land"), draws an apocalyptic landscape dominated by a female goddess and, as symbols of the male gods, fallen, meteorite-like planets.

Second-wave feminism and the Goddess movement

The ideas of Bachofen and Graves were taken up in the 1970s by second-wave feminists, such as author Merlin Stone, who took the Paleolithic Venus figurines as evidence of prehistorical matriarchal religion. She presents matriarchal religions as involving a "cult of serpents" as a major symbol of spiritual wisdom, fertility, life, strength.

Additionally, anthropologist Marija Gimbutas introduced the field of feminist archaeology in the 1970s. Her books The Goddesses and Gods of Old Europe (1974), The Language of the Goddess (1989), and The Civilization of the Goddess (1991) became standard works for the theory that a patriarchic or "androcratic" culture originated in the Bronze Age, replacing a Neolithic Goddess-centered worldview. These theories were presented as scholarly hypotheses, albeit from an ideological viewpoint, in the 1970s, but they also influenced feminist spirituality and especially feminist branches of Neo-paganism that also arose during the 1970s (see Dianic Wicca and Reclaiming (Neopaganism)), so that Matriarchal Religion is also a contemporary new religious movement within the larger field of neopaganism, generally known as the Goddess movement.

Most modern anthropologists reject the idea of a prehistoric matriarchy, but recognize matrilineal and matrifocal groups throughout human history (although matrilineal descent does not necessarily imply matriarchal political rule). Matrilineality or matrilocality occurred in some prehistoric hunter-gatherer groups and was probably common in ancient societies. Modern anthropologists note a fairly flexible system of kinship and residence among hunter-gatherers (our ancestors). It can be matrilineal and/or patrilineal, matrilocal and/or patrilocal. A number of scientists also advocate the multilocality of hunter-gatherer communities, refuting the concepts of exclusive matrilocality (matrilineality) or patrilocality (patrilineality). Also, some scientific data refute the one-line theory of evolution, which claimed that the ancient society was exclusively matriarchal, and only after some cultural shifts it moved to patriarchy. Modern data call into question this point of view. At the same time, for example, pastoralists-farmers tend to be more patrilocal and patrilineal than non-pastoralists.

In contemporary spirituality, the Goddess movement has been used a way for women to separate themselves from powerlessness they were put under and to accept and come to terms that they are powerful. Goddess Spirituality was not used early on in the feminist movement when it came to women expressing their spirituality because they did not see the correlation and saw it fit as a way to express different situations and events women faced. Also feminine spirituality and gerontology are closely derived or related to one another because feminine spirituality focuses very closely on newer generations and how they need to be in touch with themselves and the world around them. But it is also something that should be pushed onto older women because feminine spirituality, as spirituality is found in people of all ages.

The Goddess Movement and Women’s Movement have at times been closely associated with one another. One example is the idea of bodily autonomy. Many feminist movements and leaders believe that women's bodies have been oppressed for many years, with accusations of slut shaming being aimed at some religious groups, for example. Members of this movement see women being fetishsized and exploited, and believe that it has played a large role in violence against women.

Triple goddess and other deities 
There is a deity known within the movement and other spiritual groups as the Triple Goddess, who is the representation of a woman's stages or life. Members say, it's not strictly for women but for a general guide through childhood, maturity and old age but it strongly correlates with women. The Triple Goddess is a deity that is worshiped by a large swath of neopagan groups; women, children and men. In these movements, she is seen as a deity that helps people understand what is happening in their lives in all ages. Many believe the stages within women that the Triple Goddess guides them through is maiden/youth, then mother and lover and finally wise woman. All of this is rooted from Pagan people and their beliefs but has gone through changes throughout time yet her main representation has remained the same.

 Aphrodite - goddess of love 
 Aditi - mother of the gods 
 Calypso - goddess of silence 
 Durga - warrior goddess 
 Inanna - queen of heaven, goddess of rain and moonlight
 Harmonia - goddess of harmony
 Tripura Sundari - supreme almighty goddess

Cultural impact 

The Mother Goddess is a widely recognized archetype in psychoanalysis, and worship of mother earth and sky goddesses is known from numerous religious traditions of historical polytheism, especially in classical civilizations, when temples were built to many Goddesses.

Criticism

Debate continues on whether ancient matriarchal religion historically existed. American scholar Camille Paglia has argued that "Not a shred of evidence supports the existence of matriarchy anywhere in the world at any time," and further that "The moral ambivalence of the great mother Goddesses has been conveniently forgotten by those American feminists who have resurrected them." In her book The Myth of Matriarchal Prehistory (2000), scholar Cynthia Eller discusses the origins of the idea of matriarchal prehistory, evidence for and against its historical accuracy, and whether the idea is good for modern feminism.

Kavita Maya cites scholars pointing out a perceived lack of an ethnic mix in Goddess feminism, arguing that the Goddess movement incorporates "unequal relational dynamics between white Goddess feminists and women of colour", and states that it is influenced by colonial narratives, resulting in both "silencing and the romanticization of racial difference".

See also 
 Emma Curtis Hopkins
 Erich Neumann (psychologist)
 Eternal feminine
 Feminist theology
 Gender and religion
 Goddess movement
Mother goddess#Christianity
Mariolatry
Thealogy
 Witch-cult hypothesis

References 

Matriarchy
Feminist spirituality
Gender and religion